Johann Zeitler (30 April 1927 – 1 March 2018) was a German footballer who competed in the 1952 Summer Olympics and in the 1956 Summer Olympics.

References

External links
 

1927 births
2018 deaths
German footballers
Germany international footballers
Association football forwards
SpVgg Bayreuth players
Olympic footballers of Germany
Olympic footballers of the United Team of Germany
Footballers at the 1952 Summer Olympics
Footballers at the 1956 Summer Olympics
People from Bayreuth (district)
Sportspeople from Upper Franconia